Mixtape, Vol. 2 (also titled as Mixtape, Vol. 2: Hosted by DJ Dirty Rico) is a remix album released on July 2, 2013 by the Washington, D.C.-based go-go band Rare Essence. The album was compiled and remixed by DJ Dirty Rico. The album follows-up with the 2012 album Mixtape, Vol. 1.

Track listing

References

2013 compilation albums
2013 remix albums
Rare Essence albums